is a 2015 Japanese suspense mystery police drama film directed by Tōya Satō. The film is a spinoff of the television series ST Aka to Shirō no Sōsa File. It was released on January 10, 2015.

Cast
 Tatsuya Fujiwara as Samon Akagi
 Masaki Okada as Tomohisa Yurine
 Mirai Shida as Shō Aoyama
 Sei Ashina as Midori Yūki
 Masataka Kubota as Yūji Kurosaki
 Hiroki Miyake as Saizō Yamabuki
 Tetsushi Tanaka as Gorō Kikukawa
 Yuki Shibamoto as Momoko Tsutsui
 Kensei Mikami as Shinji Makimura
 Kento Hayashi as Sōsuke Ikeda
 Asaka Seto as Shiori Matsudo
 Atsuro Watabe as Toshirō Saegusa
 Yumi Adachi as Naomi Dōjima

Reception
The film has earned US$2 million at the Japanese box office.

References

External links
 

2010s mystery drama films
Nippon TV films
Film spin-offs
Japanese mystery drama films
2015 drama films
2015 films
Films directed by Tōya Satō
2010s Japanese films

ja:ST 警視庁科学特捜班#映画 ST 赤と白の捜査ファイル